One for the Road is a live album by Canadian rock band April Wine, recorded during their "One More for the Road" tour in 1984 in support of their Animal Grace (1984) album.

Track listing
All tracks written by Myles Goodwyn unless otherwise noted.
 "Anything You Want, You Got It" – 4:05
 "I Like to Rock" – 3:56
 "All Over Town" – 3:06
 "Just Between You and Me" – 3:43
 "Enough is Enough" – 3:47
 "This Could be the Right One" – 4:16
 "Sign of the Gypsy Queen" (Lorence Hud) – 5:11
 "Like a Lover, Like a Song" – 4:55
 "Comin' Right Down on Top of Me"
 "Rock n' Roll is a Vicious Game" – 4:56
 "Roller" – 4:16

Personnel
 Myles Goodwyn – vocals, guitars, keyboards
 Gary Moffet – guitars, background vocals
 Steve Lang – bass, background vocals
 Brian Greenway – vocals, guitars
 Jerry Mercer – drums

April Wine albums
Albums produced by Mike Stone (record producer)
Albums produced by Myles Goodwyn
1985 live albums
Aquarius Records (Canada) live albums
Capitol Records live albums
EMI Records live albums